Abdelali Kasbane (born 15 November 1962) is a Moroccan sprinter who specialized in the 400 metres. Moroccan record holder in 
400 M: 45"95 Soria August 4, 1990 Spain. 
Champion of Spain 400m sprint 1990 Jerez de la frontera Spain.
2° Champion of Spain 400M:45"97 Sprint Barcelona 1991.
2° Champion of Spain Sprint 200M:21"20 Valence 1992.

Kasbane finished seventh in 
4 × 400 metres relay at the 1991 World Championships, together with teammates Ali Dahane, Bouchaib Belkaid and Benyounés Lahlou.

On the individual level, Kasbane won a bronze medal at the 1991 Mediterranean Games.3°400M:45"99
Kasbane won a bronze medal at the 1991 Mediterranean 4X400M

External links

1962 births
Living people
Moroccan male sprinters
Athletes (track and field) at the 1992 Summer Olympics
Olympic athletes of Morocco
Mediterranean Games bronze medalists for Morocco
Mediterranean Games medalists in athletics
Athletes (track and field) at the 1991 Mediterranean Games
20th-century Moroccan people
21st-century Moroccan people